Two ships of the Royal Navy have been named HMS Brecon after the Brecon hunt:

 The second and current , launched in 1979, is a

External links 
 

Royal Navy ship names
Brecon